Den danske Spectator (Danish: the Danish Spectator) was one of the earliest magazines published in Danish language. It existed between 1744 and 1745 and was established by Jørgen Riis. The headquarters of the weekly magazine was in Copenhagen. It was a literary review, but it frequently contained writings on censorship, freedom of speech and motivations to write.

References

Danish-language magazines
Defunct literary magazines published in Europe
Defunct magazines published in Denmark
Literary magazines published in Denmark
Magazines established in 1744
Magazines disestablished in 1745
Magazines published in Copenhagen
Weekly magazines published in Denmark